Bull Lake is a lake on the Salmon River system in Central Frontenac, Frontenac County, Ontario, Canada. The primary inflow is a channel from Buck Lake, and primary outflow is a channel to Horseshoe Lake. There are a handful of year-round residents but most are 3 seasonal. It did not have a residential park around it until 2003.

See also
List of lakes in Ontario

References

Lakes of Frontenac County